The Dick Powell Show is an American television anthology series that ran on NBC from September 26, 1961, until September 17, 1963, primarily sponsored by the Reynolds Metals Company.

Overview 
The series was an anthology of various dramas and comedies.  Programs were initially hosted by longtime film star Dick Powell until his death from lung cancer on January 2, 1963, then by a series of guest hosts (under the revised title The Dick Powell Theater) until the series ended. The first of these hosts was Gregory Peck, who began the January 8 program with a tribute to Powell, recognizing him as "a great and good friend to our industry." Peck was followed by fellow actors such as Robert Mitchum, Frank Sinatra, Ronald Reagan, Glenn Ford, Charles Boyer, Jackie Cooper, Rock Hudson, Milton Berle, Jack Lemmon, Dean Martin, Robert Taylor, Steve McQueen, David Niven, Danny Thomas, Robert Wagner, and John Wayne.

 
It featured many future stars, producers, and directors early in their careers, including Aaron Spelling, Sam Peckinpah, and Bruce Geller. Blake Edwards wrote and directed a number of episodes, including two featuring Robert Vaughn as an Ivy League private eye known as "The Boston Terrier". Several episodes, including those featuring The Boston Terrier, doubled as pilots for potential Four Star Television series, including an unsuccessful attempt to revive The Westerner in a modern-day setting, featuring Lee Marvin in Brian Keith's original role. The original pilot episode for Burke's Law ("Who Killed Julie Greer?"), starring Powell as Amos Burke, appeared as the debut episode of this series.

The Dick Powell Show was one of the many productions of Four Star Television. The series' theme, "More Than Love" ("Theme from The Dick Powell Show") and the majority of musical compositions heard throughout the series were the work of Herschel Burke Gilbert.

Distribution 
The Navy Motion Picture Service made The Dick Powell Show available for viewing aboard ships in 1964. Episodes were packaged with episodes of The Untouchables in 108-minute programs on 16-millimeter film.

Episodes
In 1962, Peckinpah directed and co-wrote the episode "Pericles on 31st Street, which featured Theodore Bikel, Carroll O'Connor, Arthur O'Connell, and Strother Martin.

References

External links 
 
 The Dick Powell Show at CVTA

1961 American television series debuts
1963 American television series endings
1960s American anthology television series
Black-and-white American television shows
English-language television shows
NBC original programming
Television series by 20th Century Fox Television
Television series by Four Star Television